Thee Temple ov Psychick Youth, abbreviated as TOPY, was a British magical organization, fellowship and chaos magic network founded in 1981 by Genesis P-Orridge, lead member of multimedia group Psychic TV. The network, including later members of Coil and Current 93, was a loosely federated organization of members and initiates operating as an order of ceremonial magic and sex magic, as well as an experimental artistic collective.

Creation and influence
Their early network consisted of a number of "stations" worldwide including TOPY-CHAOS for Australia, TOPYNA for North America and TOPY Station 23 for the United Kingdom and Europe. Smaller, "grass-roots"-level sub-stations called Access Points were located throughout America and Europe. Throughout its existence, TOPY has been an influential group in the underground chaos magic scene. 

In 2016, French-Canadian director Jacqueline Castel began work on the feature-length documentary about TOPY, titled A Message from the Temple.

Theory and praxis

Potential TOPY members were encouraged to make magical sigils of a certain prescribed nature. These acts were to be performed on the 23rd hour (11:00pm) of the 23rd day of each month. If an individual chose to do so, they were invited to mail their sigils to a central location where the magical energy in them could be used to enhance others.

Schisms
In the early 1990s, a rift occurred within the network when Genesis P-Orridge of Psychic TV, one of the few founding members still involved at that time, and probably the best known public face of TOPY during the 1980s, announced their departure from the organization. This was later exacerbated with Genesis P-Orridge later claiming to have shut down the network upon leaving and requesting that the group no longer use the registered trademark of the Psychick Cross. Some of the remaining members of the network chose not to go along with this and carried on with their activities. TOPY continued to grow and evolve throughout the 1990s and into the 21st century while Genesis P-Orridge moved on to other projects such as The Process, as well as a similar project to TOPY called Topi.

Genesis P-Orridge's TOPY has been criticized by Dan Siepmann as being a front for abuses of power and developing an actual cult of personality.

Key texts
There have been a number of texts produced by Thee Temple ov Psychick Youth to expound its philosophies. Some of the key texts produced over the years have been:

 Axiom 23
 Thee Sigilizers Handbook
 Thee Grey Book (which was important during the 1980s but is no longer distributed by TOPY)
 Thee Black Book
Broadcast (the journal of TOPY)
Thee Psychick Bible is a compilation of TOPY literature, with updates and personal additions by Genesis P-Orridge, edited by Jason Louv.

References

Citations

Works cited

Primary sources
 
 
  Version 7.2 10.16.00 E229.

Secondary sources

External links

Chaos magic
Magical organizations
Organizations established in 1981